The Theater Center (known as The Snapple Theater Center until 2016) is a multi-theater entertainment complex located on the corner of 50th Street and Broadway in New York City.

History
The complex opened on May 22, 2006. It is a  state of the art entertainment center consisting of two theaters with a total seating capacity of 398, rehearsal studios, contemporary lobbies, WiFi, two bars with cabaret-style seating and two merchandise stands.

External links

Theatres in Manhattan
Off-Broadway theaters
Theatres completed in 2006
Keurig Dr Pepper
Midtown Manhattan